Richard Norton (born 6 January 1950) is an Australian martial artist, stuntman and actor. After high school, Norton worked as a bodyguard in the entertainment business before pursuing an acting career. He has attained a 10th Degree in Zen Do Kai, Australia.
His first screen appearance was in the 1980 Chuck Norris film The Octagon, and he has worked on over 80 feature films and television programs. He appeared in a number of Martial arts films, facing off against stars such as Jackie Chan, Sammo Hung, Yasuaki Kurata, Benny Urquidez, Don "The Dragon" Wilson and Cynthia Rothrock.

Career 
Norton worked as a personal bodyguard for The Rolling Stones, Linda Ronstadt, James Taylor, David Bowie, ABBA, John Belushi, Fleetwood Mac and Stevie Nicks.

Norton has been on the cover (as well as featured in editorials) of martial arts magazines including Black Belt twice (published since 1987), Australasian Fighting Arts in 1983 (published 1974 to 1998), Blitz Magazine, Impact (published 1992 to 2010) with Cynthia Rothrock in 1993, and with Jackie Chan in 1997, Inside Kung Fu, MA Training (published 1988 to 2000), Martial Arts & Combat Sports (published 1999 to 2002), and Martial Arts & Combat Sports. In 2014 Norton was inducted into the Australasian Martial Arts Hall of Fame.  He also is the Head Instructor of the Richard Norton Brazilian Jiu-Jitsu organisation.

Film 
Norton is known for his appearances in Hong Kong action films.
Norton's Hong Kong credits include The Magic Crystal, Twinkle Twinkle Lucky Stars, City Hunter (a live-action remake of the manga), Millionaire's Express, and Mr. Nice Guy. A signature catchphrase of Norton's characters is "Painful?", usually asked after striking a decisive blow.  The most comical example is in Twinkle, Twinkle Lucky Stars, where he faces Sammo Hung and in the movie Millionaire's Express against Yasuaki Kurata.

Over his career, Norton has faced off with many top martial arts action stars, including Jackie Chan (in three films, including City Hunter), Sammo Hung, Yasuaki Kurata, Benny "the Jet" Urquidez (in Kick Fighter), Don "The Dragon" Wilson (in CyberTracker), and Cynthia Rothrock (in China O'Brien and Lady Dragon).

Norton served as fight coordinator on the 2007 film The Condemned (starring "Stone Cold" Steve Austin and Vinnie Jones), doubling for Jones. He also starred in a contemporary drama, Under the Red Moon.

In August 2010, Norton appeared at Berlin Movie Con, a convention of martial arts where he was joined by ten other stars of Martial arts cinema in a two-day show. It was staged in the Universal Hall in Berlin, Germany. Among his fellow stars were Cynthia Rothrock, Don "The Dragon" Wilson and Conan Lee.

Filmography 
 ABBA: The Movie (1977) – as himself, bodyguard and fitness trainer (uncredited)
 The Octagon (1980) – Kyo [was also stunt-man]
 Force: Five (1981) – Ezekiel
 Forced Vengeance (1982) – Herb [was also a stunt-man]
 Gymkata (1985) – Zamir [was also a fight choreographer]
 Twinkle, Twinkle Lucky Stars (1985) – Caucasian Assassin
 American Ninja (1985) – MP (uncredited) [was also stunt-man]
 Equalizer 2000 (1986) – Slade
 Future Hunters (1986) – Matthew
 Millionaire's Express – (1986) – Bandit
 Magic Crystal (1987) – Karov
 Return of the Kickfighter (1987) – Brad Cooper
 The Fighter (1987) – Ryan Travers
 Fight to Win (1987) – Armstrong
 Not Another Mistake (1987) – Richard Straker
 Jungle Assassin (1988)
 Hawkeye (1988)
 Licence to Kill (1989) {007 film, no. 16}
 The Sword of Bushido (1989) – Zac Connors
 Hyper Space (1989) – Thomas Stanton
 The Blood of Heroes (1989) – Bone [also stunt-man]
 Blood Street (1990)
 China O'Brien (1988) – Matt Conroy
 China O'Brien II (1990) – Matt Conroy
 Raiders of the Sun (1992) – Brodie
 Rage and Honor (1992) –  Preston Michaels
 Lady Dragon (1992) – Ludwig Hauptman
 Ironheart (1992) – Milverstead
 City Hunter (1993) – MacDonald
 Rage and Honor II (1993) – Preston Michaels
 Walker, Texas Ranger (1993) – various roles, incl.; Frank Scanlon, Jonas Graves, Drug Dealer # 3, Mercenary # 1 [martial arts coordinator, in at least three episodes]
 Deathfight (1994) – Jack Dameron
 Direct Hit (1994) – Rogers
 CyberTracker (1994) – Ross
 The Supreme Warrior (1995) – Earth Warlord
 Tough and Deadly (1995) – Agent Norton
 Under the Gun (1995) – Frank Torrence
 For Life or Death (1996)
 Soul of the Avenger (1997) – Sir Xavier
 Strategic Command (1997) – Carlos Gruber
 The New Adventures of Robin Hood (TV Series) (1997/ 1998) – episodes; 'The Legion' ('97), Rossamar – 'Outlaw Express' ('97), Outlaw Trueco and 'Assault on Castle Dundeen' ('98), Lord Chilton [also the stunt coordinator]
 Mr. Nice Guy (1997) –  Giancarlo Luchetti
 Tex Murphy: Overseer (1998) – Big Jim Slade
 Black Thunder (1998) – Rather
 Nautilus (2000) – John Harris
 The Rage Within (2001) – Keller
 Amazons and Gladiators (2001) – Lucius [also stunt coordinator and Second Unit Director]
 Redemption (2002) – Tom 'Snake' Sasso
 Dream Warrior (2003) – Archer [also Second Unit Director]
 Mind Games (2003) – Carter Tallerin
 Road House 2 (2006) –  Victor Cross
 Under a Red Moon (2008) – Jonathan Dunn
 Man of Blood (2008) – Lee Francis
 Dead in Love (2009) – Danny's Dad
 Tesla Effect: A Tex Murphy Adventure (2014)
 Mad Max: Fury Road (2015) – The Prime Imperator [also the fight coordinator/ stunt performer]
 Suicide Squad (2016) – fight coordinator
 The Suicide Squad (2021) – fight coordinator
 Rage (2021) – Detective John Bennett

 Television 
 Spartacus: War of the Damned (2013) – legendary gladiator Hilarus and 'personal trainer' of sorts, to Crassus. (Episode: Enemies of Rome)

 Martial arts experience 
Norton has trained in many aspects of martial arts, including Judo, Karate, Brazilian Jiu-Jitsu, Aikido, Thai boxing and several Japanese weapons systems. He used this experience to co-create the hybrid martial art Zen Do Kai with fellow security guard Bob Jones. He has a 5th-Degree Shihan rank Black Belt in Goju Ryu, 8th-Degree Masters rank in Chun Kuk Do (Chuck Norris system), 5th-Degree Black belt in Brazilian Jiu-Jitsu and a 10th-degree Black Belt in Zen Do Kai Karate, an organisation of over 5,000 members. He has trained with Tino Ceberano, Tadashi Yamashita, Fumio Demura, Bill 'Superfoot' Wallace, Pete "Sugar Foot" Cunningham, Jean-Jacques Machado and Chuck Norris.

Norton holds seminars covering such topics as street defence, martial arts weapons drills, Brazilian Jiu-Jitsu and mixed martial arts. In September 2007, Norton released a two-disc DVD set on Black Belt Digital Video called Black Belt training Complexes. The DVDs show Norton executing fast and accurate examples of his skill, and some additional seminar footage is also included. They focus on the development of speed, power and continuity of movement, with explanations of the principles.

Norton became the fight coordinator on Walker, Texas Ranger in 1993. He was a minor (sometimes uncredited) character in several episodes (at least eight), and had a starring role as villainous businessman Frank Scanlon in The Avenging Angel; he was in the two-part finale The Final Show/Down'' as Jonas Graves, part of Emile Lavocat (Marshall R. Teague)'s criminal gang (he also appears in the "flashback" scenes illustrating the end of the Hayes Cooper legend, as part of Mills "Moon" Lavocat (also Marshall R. Teague)'s desperado gang).

Fighting Stars Magazine ranked Norton's climactic fight with Chuck Norris in The Octagon (1980) as #13 on its list of the 25 greatest fight scenes of all time.

References

External links 
 of Richard Norton's Brazilian jiu-jitsu

Australian male film actors
Australian male television actors
1950 births
Living people
Australian male karateka